Between Two Ferns: The Movie is a 2019 American comedy film directed by Scott Aukerman and starring Zach Galifianakis that acts as a spin-off of the web series of the same name. The film was released on September 20, 2019, on Netflix.

Plot
Zach Galifianakis is the host of his public access TV show Between Two Ferns. After Will Ferrell discovered the show and uploaded it to Funny or Die, Zach has become a viral laughing stock, attracting millions of views every day due to his poor direction. During an interview with Matthew McConaughey, Zach accidentally sets off a sprinkler system and causes a water leak which floods the room, drowning Matthew, although he is later resuscitated.

The incident attracts more views than ever, resulting in Will to offer Zach to turn ten episodes in two weeks and become president of Funny or Die; Zach, dreaming of having his own talk-show, accepts and starts a road trip. While the road trip is successful; Zach bonds with his crew and even though the interviews with guests David Letterman, Paul Rudd, Chrissy Teigen (with whom he has an affair after trying to interview her because of Jake Gyllenhaal's canceled flight), John Legend (who sprays him with mace because of the affair), Jon Hamm, Hailee Steinfeld, Awkwafina, Tiffany Haddish, Benedict Cumberbatch, and Tessa Thompson are successful, Zach becomes short of money due to expensive activities. This causes Zach's manager, Carol (Lauren Lapkus) to steal items from Peter Dinklage during his interview to sell them and buy their return to Los Angeles.

On their way back, Zach gets into an accident by reading emails while driving, destroying his two beloved ferns. Despite antagonizing his crew, they reconcile and go back to Los Angeles and win the deal. Learning he will get four new ferns, Zach celebrates and starts his new show, Ferns with Zach Galifianakis and within a month became a national success. Although, his crew criticizes its lack of charm and personality causing Zach to cancel his talk-show and leave with his crew, not before two of his new ferns get destroyed by a car.

Cast
 Zach Galifianakis as himself
 Lauren Lapkus as Carol Hunch
 Ryan Gaul as Cameron "Cam" Campbell
 Jiavani Linayao as "Boom Boom" De Laurentis
 Edi Patterson as Shirl Clarts
 Rekha Shankar as Gaya
 Mary Scheer as Frannie Scheindlin
 Mary Holland as Gerri Plop
 Matt Besser as Mike Burcho
 Phil Hendrie as Bill Yum
 Paul Rust as Eugene Tennyson
 A. D. Miles as Michael
 Blake Clark as Earl Canderton
 Paul F. Tompkins as Burnt Millipede
 Demi Adejuyigbe as DJ Fwap
 Mandell Maughan as Nic Jeffries

As themselves

 Awkwafina
 Chance the Rapper
 John Cho
 Benedict Cumberbatch
 Peter Dinklage
 Will Ferrell
 Gal Gadot
 Tiffany Haddish
 Jon Hamm
 Rashida Jones
 Brie Larson
 John Legend
 David Letterman
 Matthew McConaughey
 Keanu Reeves
 Paul Rudd
 Jason Schwartzman
 Adam Scott
 Hailee Steinfeld
 Michael Cera
 Chrissy Teigen
 Tessa Thompson
 Phoebe Bridgers
 Matt Berninger
 Walter Martin
 Bruce Willis (archive footage)

Production
On May 23, 2019, Funny or Die announced that it would make a film version of Between Two Ferns with Zach Galifianakis for Netflix. The film was directed by Scott Aukerman, the co-creator of the original series, and produced by Aukerman, Galifianakis, Caitlin Daley and Mike Farah. On June 17, 2019, it was reported that Ryan Gaul, Lauren Lapkus, and Jiavani Linayao were part of the cast alongside Galifianakis.

Several ideas for Between Two Ferns: The Movie that Galifianakis came up with and subsequently discarded early in development were used on his show Baskets.

Aukerman cited several other mockumentary films as inspiration, including This Is Spinal Tap, Borat, and Popstar: Never Stop Never Stopping.

Release
On September 3, 2019, the first trailer for the movie was released.

The film was released on September 20, 2019 on Netflix.

Reception
The website's critical consensus reads, "Between Two Ferns: The Movie shows the strain of stretching a series of web shorts to feature length, but should still satisfy fans of the source material." On Metacritic, the film has a  weighted average score of 59 out of 100, based on 13 critics, indicating "mixed or average reviews".

Nick Allen of RogerEbert.com gave the film 3 1/2 out of 4 stars, saying that "takes what's made the series so extremely funny and lovingly expands it into a feature film, in a way that would make all those ‘90s Saturday Night Live movies envious." Writing for The A.V. Club, William Hughes gave the film a B, praising its humor but with the slightly muted criticism that "some of the original, exciting venom of the show’s appeal ends up a bit diluted along the way".

Accolades
Scott Aukerman, Zach Galifianakis, Mike Farah, Caitlin Daley and Corinne Eckart were nominated for a 2020 Primetime Emmy Award in the category Outstanding Short Form Variety Series for Between Two Ferns with Zack Galifianakis: The Movie, Sorta Uncut Interviews, consisting of uncut interviews from the film featuring David Letterman, Paul Rudd, Awkwafina, Benedict Cumberbatch, Brie Larson, Keanu Reeves, Hailee Steinfeld, and Adam Scott released on the Netflix Is A Joke YouTube channel and FunnyOrDie.com.

References

External links
 
 

2019 films
American comedy road movies
American mockumentary films
2010s comedy road movies
Films based on web series
English-language Netflix original films
Films about television people
Films directed by Scott Aukerman
Films produced by Scott Aukerman
Films produced by Zach Galifianakis
Films scored by Alex Wurman
Films set in North Carolina
Films with screenplays by Scott Aukerman
Films with screenplays by Zach Galifianakis
2010s English-language films
2010s American films